Collison House may refer to:

Collison House (Bald Knob, Arkansas), listed on the National Register of Historic Places in White County, Arkansas
Collison House (Newport, Delaware), listed on the National Register of Historic Places in New Castle County, Delaware